The men's individual time trial event was part of the road cycling programme at the 1924 Summer Olympics.  The results of individual cyclists were summed to give team results, with the worst time for each team being ignored. It was the third appearance of the team time trial; France successfully defended its 1920 championship in the event while Sweden won its third medal.

Fifteen countries fielded four-man teams, out of the total field of 71 cyclists from 22 countries. The course was a  loop beginning and ending at the Stade Olympique Yves-du-Manoir.

Results

Source:

References

Cycling at the Summer Olympics – Men's team time trial
Road cycling at the 1924 Summer Olympics